Faiano  is an Italian town and hamlet (frazione) of the municipality of Pontecagnano Faiano in the province of Salerno, Campania region. Along with the main town of Pontecagnano it is de jure the secondary seat of its municipality.

History
Town's name derives from the word fajo, meaning beech in Neapolitan, and is referred to a beechwood.

Located on an area rich of thermal waters, still known in Ancient Roman era, the town counts a spring named Sette Bocche (Seven Mouths). 1 km from its center, but in the municipal territory of Montecorvino Pugliano, there are located some ancient Thermae with a spring of sulphurous water.

Geography
Faiano is a hilltown that lies on the road linking Pontecagnano (4 km) to Montecorvino Pugliano (5,5 km) and the village of Santa Tecla (3 km). It is located below the Picentini mountain range and the homonym regional park. The town is 1,5 km far from the nearby village of Baroncino, 12 from Salerno, 7,5 from Bellizzi, 10 from Battipaglia and 9 from Giffoni Valle Piana, with which it is connected by a road passing the village of Ornito.

Gallery

Transport
Faiano is not served by railways but the nearest station is Pontecagnano, on the Salerno-Reggio Calabria line. Nearest motorway exits are "Pontecagnano" and "Montecorvino Pugliano" on the A2 Motorway Salerno-Reggio Calabria.  7 km from the town is located the Salerno-Pontecagnano Airport Costa d'Amalfi.

References

This article incorporates information from the Italian Wikipedia.

External links

 Faiano official website
 Pontecagnano Faiano municipal website

Frazioni of the Province of Salerno